Chris Petersen (born August 18, 1963) is an American actor. Beginning his career as a child actor at the age of 12, he is best known for his roles in the feature films When Every Day Was the Fourth of July, The Swarm and The Little Dragons. Rising to prominence among teen audiences during the late 1970s and 1980s, he is also remembered for starring in various teen anthology series of the time including ABC Afterschool Specials, CBS Afternoon Playhouse and NBC Special Treat, as well as for his co-starring role on Norman Lear's "interactive" situation comedy, The Baxters.

Early life
Christopher P. Petersen was born on August 18, 1963 in Los Angeles, sometimes mistakenly credited professionally as "Chris Peterson". His younger brother is former child actor Pat Petersen (born August 9, 1966), who also appeared in a number of films and television series of the time, including the 1980 feature film The Little Dragons.

Career

Early career
Petersen began his television career in 1977 with a small featured role on the ABC action-crime series Starsky & Hutch. In the episode titled The Psychic, Petersen made his television debut with a small role as "Ringo", one of two boys who are caught stealing tires from Starsky's Ford Gran Torino. 

In January 1978, Petersen had a guest-starring role on the NBC period drama Little House on the Prairie. In the episode titled The Rivals, Petersen played Jimmy Hill, a boy in Walnut Grove, who Laura (Melissa Gilbert) falls in love with and whose affections she feels she must compete for; ultimately resulting in what would be Laura's first kiss on the series.

Teen career
In March 1978, Petersen landed his first film role in the NBC television movie, When Every Day Was the Fourth of July. In the film, Petersen starred as Danny Cooper (later portrayed by fellow child star Ronnie Scribner in the sequel), a boy growing up in a small New England town in 1937 who, along with his sister (Katy Kurtzman), must find a way to exonerate the town's gentle misfit after he is accused of a murder. Later that same month, Petersen co-starred on the popular children's anthology series The ABC Afterschool Special. 

In The Rag Tag Champs, Petersen played Pat McCleod, one of the players on a troubled baseball team in need of a qualified coach. In July of that year, Petersen appeared in his first feature film role in Irwin Allen's camp disaster-thriller, The Swarm. In the film, Petersen had a featured role as "Hal", one of the boys who fire-bomb a hive of killer bees that are attacking the residents in their small Texas town.

In December 1978, Petersen followed up with the lead role in a 5-part mini-series presentation of CBS Afternoon Playhouse. The series, an anthology showcase primarily aimed at adolescents, was CBS's answer to the ABC Afterschool Special. In the special presentation titled Joey and Redhawk, Petersen played the titular role of Joey, a 14-year-old from Ohio who learns to survive in the Colorado Rocky Mountains with the help of an apache he meets named Redhawk (Guillermo San Juan). Advertised as an "afternoon mini-series for young people", the feature-length story debuted on Monday December 4, 1978, with a 30-minute installment airing each day through Friday December 8, 1978, and also featured an early co-starring appearance by Eric Stoltz as well as a teenage Danny Bonaduce. In March 1979, Petersen appeared on the CBS action-adventure series The Incredible Hulk. In the episode titled No Escape, Petersen guest-starred as Steve, a young teen who encounters "The Hulk" (Lou Ferrigno) in an all-night laundromat and runs out frightened without his clothes.

In September 1979, Petersen landed one of the lead roles on the Norman Lear situation comedy The Baxters. On the series, Petersen co-starred as Jonah Baxter, the teenage son of a middle-class suburban family living in St. Louis. The series was the first "interactive sitcom" of its kind, wherein the first half of each 30-minute episode presented a vignette dramatizing the events in the lives of the Baxter family, and the second half was an "instant analysis" talk show segment, giving a live studio audience and guests an opportunity to express their opinions about the topic being presented that week. Although credited by several online sources as "Chris Peterson", this is simply a misspelling and he was credited properly on the show. The series was produced in Hollywood for the 1979–80 season before production was moved to Ontario, Canada and an entirely new Baxter family was introduced, played by an all new cast.

In March 1980, Petersen appeared in a co-starring role on an episode of The NBC Special Treat, yet another anthology series showcasing adolescent teleplays akin to the ABC Afterschool Specials. In the episode titled The House at 12 Rose Street, Chris starred alongside fellow child actor Moosie Drier, as one of the boys in an all-white suburban neighborhood when the first African-American family moves in. 

In July 1980, Petersen appeared in what would be his first and only starring feature film role in the action-comedy, The Little Dragons (also known as Karate Kids U.S.A.). The film co-starred both Chris and his younger brother Pat as brothers Zack and Woody, two young karate students who set out to rescue a new friend after she is kidnapped and held for ransom by a woman (Ann Sothern) and her two bumbling sons. Although most online sources list the film as being released in 1980, the Petersen brothers appear to be notably younger than in their various other roles during that same year. Indicated by their youthful appearance and hairstyles, the film appears to have been filmed sometime between 1977 and 1978.

Later career
After finishing his year on The Baxters, just as his brother Pat was rising to prominence as Michael Fairgate on the CBS primetime drama Knots Landing, Chris Petersen's acting career was coming to its end. In October 1981, he had a small role on the NBC mystery-crime drama Quincy, M.E.. In the episode titled Memories of Allison, Petersen appeared as one of the students attending a high school "career day"; his character simply credited as "Boy". The following month (November 1981), Petersen made what would be his final on-screen acting appearance, in an episode of M*A*S*H, titled "Wheelers and Dealers". Petersen appeared in a small role as one of three young recruits whom B. J. Hunnicutt challenges to a game of pinball; this time simply credited as "Second Recruit".

Filmography

References

Bibliography
 Holmstrom, John. The Moving Picture Boy: An International Encyclopaedia from 1895 to 1995. Norwich, Michael Russell, 1996, p. 347.

External links
 
 

1963 births
Male actors from Los Angeles
American male child actors
American male film actors
American male television actors
Living people